Screwfix is a retailer of trade tools, accessories and hardware products based in the United Kingdom.  Founded in 1979 as the Woodscrew Supply Company, the company was acquired in July 1999 by Kingfisher plc, which also owns B&Q, and is listed on the London Stock Exchange.

History

Based in Yeovil, Somerset, Screwfix started life as the Woodscrew Supply Company in 1979. The company’s first mail order catalogue consisted of a single page, solely dedicated to screws; in 1987, this was increased to a four page version named "Handimail" offering hardware to DIY and trade professionals.

The first catalogue to be produced in the name of Screwfix Direct appeared in 1992, and, with a turnover of £4 million, the company moved into larger premises at Pen Mill, Yeovil, in 1994. In 1998 its turnover increased to £28 million, and the company moved to a purpose built site at Houndstone Business Park in Yeovil.

The first website was launched in February 1999, five months before the company was acquired by Kingfisher plc. Later that year, the company expanded its site in Houndstone, with the opening of a new contact centre employing five hundred people. In January 2000, Screwfix announced a turnover of £58 million, and trading hours were extended to seven days a week.

In January 2001, turnover first exceeded £100 million, and after further expansion in the contact centre, Screwfix announced sales of £185 million in 2002. The thousandth employee joined the organisation in March 2000, and a month later, next day deliveries within mainland United Kingdom were introduced.

The company relaunched the website later that year, and was awarded Retailer Of the Year. In September 2004, to continue to meet the increased demand, a fully automated, 325,000 sq ft distribution centre was opened in Trentham, Stoke on Trent, fulfilling next day orders. The Screwfix Community, an online forum, was also launched later that year.

In 2008, the company launched Plumbfix, offering qualified plumbers a wider range of specialist goods at better prices, this was followed by the launch of Electricfix the next year. In July 2011, Screwfix launched its "Click & Collect" service, which enables customers to order and pay securely online, and collect in store in as little as one minute. 

Also that year, Screwfix's mobile website was set up, providing an easier shopping experience when not at home. Click & Collect was introduced onto this platform in January 2012, since then sales from mobiles have increased by 250%.

By 2013, Screwfix launched its three hundredth store. In 2014 it opened seven stores in Northern Ireland and four stores in Germany. Since 2013, the web and mobile site has been extended to include 33,000 products available online, and the contact centre extended their opening hours to deliver a 24/7 service.

2015 saw the launch of Screwfix's Quickshop app, which allows customers to build their order on their smartphone and generates a QR code which can be scanned at the till point in store.

Screwfix.com attracts up to 7 million unique visitors per week and the Screwfix Click & Collect service means customers can purchase supplies online (or over the phone) and then collect from store in as little as one minute. In 2016, Screwfix won the "Teleperformance Customer Experience Initiative of the Year" at the Retail Week Awards. In 2018, Screwfix was awarded Retail Week’s "Best Retailer over £250m" and "Digital Pioneer".

In 2021 Screwfix Sprint was introduced, allowing customers to place an order on the new Screwfix app and get it delivered straight to their location – either at home or on site – in less than an hour. Screwfix Sprint is currently available in over 300 eligible stores, reaching 40% of the UK population.

In July 2022, Screwfix opened its 800th store in Bourton-on-the-water, Gloucestershire, bringing Screwfix closer to its overall target of 1,000 stores across the UK and Republic of Ireland.

Stores
As of November 2021, Screwfix operates a network of over 750 stores across the United Kingdom and Ireland. In March 2021, Screwfix announced they would be opening 50 new stores (40 in the UK and 10 in Ireland) by the end of January 2021.

The Screwfix Foundation
In April 2013, Screwfix launched its first charity, The Screwfix Foundation. It supports charity projects involved in fixing, repairing, maintaining, or improving community buildings or facilities for those in need throughout the United Kingdom. The Screwfix Foundation works with Macmillan and also donates to local charities throughout the United Kingdom.

The Screwfix Foundation has donated over £10m since it was launched (as of June 2022).

References

External links
Screwfix official site
Screwfix Ireland official site
The Screwfix Foundation official site

Companies based in Yeovil
Wholesalers of the United Kingdom
Home improvement companies of the United Kingdom
Kingfisher plc
Retail companies established in 1979
British companies established in 1979
1999 mergers and acquisitions
British brands